Il lumacone (The Big Snail) is a 1974 Italian comedy-drama film directed by Paolo Cavara.

Cast
 Turi Ferro as Gianni Rodinò
 Agostina Belli as Elisa 
 Ninetto Davoli as  Ginetto
 Francesco Mulè as  Pietro
 Gabriella Giorgelli as  Paola
 Isa Danieli as Carmela 
 Fioretta Mari as  Teresa 
 Liù Bosisio as The lodger
 Franca Alma Moretti as  Giorgina  
 Tuccio Musumeci as The usher 
 Gianfranco Barra as  The doorman
 Giorgio Bixio as  Don Mauro 
 Franco Bracardi as  Giorgina's client

References

External links

Italian comedy-drama films
Films directed by Paolo Cavara
Films set in Rome
1974 comedy-drama films
1974 films
Films with screenplays by Ruggero Maccari
1970s Italian films